Michael Woods (born 8 December 1935) is a former Irish Fianna Fáil politician who served as Government Chief Whip from July 1979 to December 1979, Minister for Social Welfare from 1979 to 1981, 1987 to 1991, March 1982 to December 1982 and 1993 to 1994, Minister for Health from 1979 to 1981, March 1982 to December 1982 and November 1994 to December 1994, Minister for Agriculture and Food from 1991 to 1992, Minister for the Marine from 1992 to 1993, Minister for the Marine and Natural Resources from 1997 to 2000 and Minister for Education and Science from 2000 to 2002. He served as a Teachta Dála (TD) from 1977 to 2011.

Early life
Woods was born in County Wicklow in December 1935. He was educated at Christian Brothers in Synge Street, Dublin; University College Dublin and Harvard Business School. He qualified with a degree in Agricultural science and a PhD in science.

Political career
Woods joined Fianna Fáil in 1968. At the 1977 general election he stood for the Dáil in the Dublin Clontarf constituency as a Fianna Fáil candidate and was elected alongside Fianna Fáil stalwart George Colley. From 1981 to 2011, he was elected for the Dublin North-East constituency. In 1979, Jack Lynch appointed him as Minister of State at the Department of the Taoiseach (Government Chief Whip). That same year Woods supported Colley in his leadership bid, but the other candidate, Charles Haughey, was successful.

Despite Woods having supported Colley, Haughey appointed him Minister for Health and Social Welfare. He held that post until 1981, and again in the short-lived 1982 government. In 1987, Fianna Fáil returned to power and he returned as Minister for Social Welfare. In 1991, he became Minister for Agriculture and Food. In 1992, Woods entered the contest to succeed Haughey as leader. He received little support and withdrew from the contest. The eventual victor, Albert Reynolds, retained Woods as Minister for the Marine in his new cabinet. Following the formation of the Fianna Fáil–Labour Party coalition in 1993, Woods remained in the cabinet, this time with the Social Welfare portfolio, and—after the mass resignation of the Labour ministers—was additionally appointed Minister for Health.

After three years in opposition, Fianna Fáil returned to power in 1997. Woods was appointed Minister for the Marine and Natural Resources. He introduced a £70 million overhaul of Ireland's fishing fleet and also launched a new maritime college. In the cabinet reshuffle in 2000, he replaced Micheál Martin as Minister for Education. Woods was not retained in the cabinet following the 2002 general election. He was Chairman of the Joint Oireachtas Committee on Foreign Affairs from 2002 to 2007.

He retired from politics at the 2011 general election.

Controversies
While serving as Minister for Education, Woods signed a controversial agreement with 18 Irish religious orders involved in child sex-abuse scandals which limited their compensation liability to the victims of abuse to only €128 million. This compensation scheme is projected to eventually cost the Irish government €1.35 billion. The agreement was signed just before the 2002 general election, and consequently was not laid before the cabinet for its approval. It then remained unpublished for several months.

In 2003, after brokering the deal, Woods claimed his strong Catholic faith made him the most suitable person to negotiate the deal. He also denied allegations that he was a member of Opus Dei or the Knights of Saint Columbanus after the group Survivors of Child Abuse alleged he was a member of the former.

After the publication of the report of the Commission to Inquire into Child Abuse (CICA), Woods defended the deal; he claimed the Department of Education and Science had the management role in the schools in question and that the state knew all the details when making the deal. Mary Raftery criticised his remarks, pointing out that some of them contradicted remarks made by Woods himself.

References

 

1935 births
Living people
Alumni of University College Dublin
Fianna Fáil TDs
Harvard Business School alumni
Members of the 21st Dáil
Members of the 22nd Dáil
Members of the 23rd Dáil
Members of the 24th Dáil
Members of the 25th Dáil
Members of the 26th Dáil
Members of the 27th Dáil
Members of the 28th Dáil
Members of the 29th Dáil
Members of the 30th Dáil
Ministers for Agriculture (Ireland)
Ministers for Education (Ireland)
Ministers for Health (Ireland)
Ministers for Social Affairs (Ireland)
Ministers of State of the 21st Dáil
Government Chief Whip (Ireland)
Politicians from County Wicklow
People educated at Synge Street CBS
People from Raheny